Christopher Bellard (born June 17, 1979), also known by his stage name Young Maylay, is an American rapper, record producer and actor based in Los Angeles, California. He is best known for his portrayal of Carl "CJ" Johnson, the main character and protagonist of the 2004 video game Grand Theft Auto: San Andreas.

Early life 
Christopher Bellard was born and raised in Los Angeles, California amid gang violence and the peak of gangsta rap in a crime-riddled area in poverty which inspired his rapping career. Bellard is the younger cousin of actor and rapper Shawn Fonteno, who played Franklin Clinton, one of the protagonists of Grand Theft Auto V.

Music career

Early years: 2000–2005
His rapping career eventually took off in 2000, at the age of 21. With help from King T, Maylay made his first appearance in Killa Tay's Thug Thisle, with the song #1 Hottest Coast (Killa Cali) in 2000. Later he appeared in Rodney O & Joe Cooley's Summer Heat in 2002. Since then, he has been featured on many releases across the West Coast. Maylay wrote the majority of King T's album Ruthless Chronicles. He founded his independent label in 2005 with the money from GTA San Andreas and released his debut mixtape in the same year.

Pre-Lench Mob: 2006–2008
In 2006, Maylay was featured in Deeyah's single "What Will It Be" with a music video. In the same year, he appeared in DJ Crazy Toones' CT Experience, it was the first collaboration of the trio DJ Crazy Toones, WC and Young Maylay. In 2007 the trio began working in Maylay's album The Real Coast Guard. The album was released in 2008 and later that year, WC signed Young Maylay to Bigg Swang/Lench Mob.

Lench Mob days: 2008–present
Lench Mob Records were set in 2006 to put out Ice Cube's and WC's records, but later other artists were signed, like Young Maylay, who is considered a veteran by Ice Cube. DJ Crazy Toones created two blogs for Maylay, the first is called Who's Young Maylay? Mix Blog and the second is called Young Maylay, WC & Bad Lucc Mix Blog.

Young Maylay is working on three albums, by himself, WC and Crazy Toones. Young Maylay is featured on two tracks by Ice Cube called "Y'all Know Who I Am" and "Too West Coast" on the album I Am the West.

In 2010 Young Maylay was featured on two tracks on the album DJ Premier Presents Year Round Records - Get Used To Us. The track "Temptation" is a solo performance, while the track "Ain't Nuttin' Changed (remix)" is a collaborative effort with Blaq Poet and MC Eiht.

In an interview, when asked about a new album, Maylay said:

OBG Rider Clicc 
OBG Rider Clicc is Young Maylay's rap trio (with Young Dre The Truth and Killa Polk) the group first appeared in Young Dre's album called Revolution In Progress The Movement with the single Let's Get The Game Bacc Right. and later appeared with Compton Cavie, Dresta and BG Knocc Out with the song Wes Indeed in the Cali Luv mixtape.

Grand Theft Auto: San Andreas 
Maylay was working in New York when he received a phone call from DJ Pooh, who was in a meeting with staff from Rockstar Games. They started a regular conversation about music which, unknown to Maylay, occurred on speakerphone. Rockstar staff heard the conversation, and after the conversation between the two ended, they encouraged Pooh to bring Maylay in to audition. A few weeks after the audition, Rockstar reviewed the tapes and decided on Maylay for the role of the main character of Grand Theft Auto: San Andreas, Carl "CJ" Johnson.

In the game, Maylay starred alongside celebrities such as actors Samuel L. Jackson, James Woods, Peter Fonda, Clifton Powell, Faizon Love, Big Boy, David Cross, Andy Dick, Chris Penn, Danny Dyer, Frank Vincent, Sara Tanaka, Charlie Murphy and William Fichtner, rappers Ice-T, MC Eiht, Chuck D, The Game, Kid Frost and Yo-Yo and musicians George Clinton, Axl Rose, Sly & Robbie, Michael Bivins, and Shaun Ryder. When asked if he would consider reprising the role of CJ in any future Grand Theft Auto titles if given the opportunity, Maylay stated that he would never play the role of CJ again due to conflicts with Rockstar Games.

Maylaynium Muziq 
Malaynium Muziq is Young Maylay's own independent record label based in Studio City, California. His mixtapes were released on this label.

Discography

Mixtapes
 San Andreas: The Original Mixtape (2005)
 The Real Coast Guard (2008)

Filmography

Film

Television

Video games

References

External links 
 
 Young Maylay online
 Young Maylay official Twitter
 Discography at Discogs

1979 births
African-American male rappers
African-American male actors
American male video game actors
Record producers from California
Living people
Male actors from California
Male actors from Los Angeles
Rappers from Los Angeles
Gangsta rappers
West Coast hip hop musicians
21st-century American rappers
21st-century American male musicians
21st-century African-American musicians
20th-century African-American people